Swatow Street is a street in the Wan Chai area of Hong Kong island, Hong Kong. It intersects with Queen's Road East and Johnston Road. It is named after Shantou.

Roads on Hong Kong Island
Wan Chai